12 Gauge is the self-titled debut album by 12 Gauge, released on May 20, 1994, through Scotti Bros. Records.

The album is best known for its lead single and 12 Gauge's only top 40 hit, "Dunkie Butt". The single spent 21 weeks on the Billboard Hot 100, peaking at No. 28 and was certified gold by the RIAA for sales of 500,000 copies. The album itself made it to No. 141 on the Billboard 200, and 44 on the Top R&B/Hip-Hop Albums, the only one of his three albums to reach the Billboard charts. After the Zomba Music Group purchased the Scotti Bros. label, the album was re-released in 1998.

Track listing

Charts

1994 debut albums
Scotti Brothers Records albums
12 Gauge (rapper) albums